Central City is the main core of residential and commercial areas in Salt Lake City, Utah, United States.

The neighborhood includes the area east of downtown along South Temple to the University of Utah campus and south to approximately 1300 South. South of 600 South, the neighborhood extends west to about 300 West. 

The UTA TRAX University light rail line serves the neighborhood along 400 South.

Several condominium developments have been built in the neighborhood in recent years, which have convenient access to downtown nightlife and art venues as well as government facilities, the city's new main library and the university. Significant commercial activity has developed along 400 South, especially directly north of Trolley Square.

Neighborhoods in Salt Lake City